Hervé Rugwiro (born 21 December 1992) is a Rwandan football defender for APR FC.

References

1992 births
Living people
Rwandan footballers
Rwanda international footballers
APR F.C. players
Association football defenders
2018 African Nations Championship players
Rwanda A' international footballers
2020 African Nations Championship players